The Saint James the Apostle Parish Church also known as The Roman Catholic Church of Saint James the Apostle or commonly known as Church of Paete  is the only Roman Catholic church in Paete, Laguna, Philippines. Its patron saint is Saint James the Apostle and his feast is celebrated every 25 July. The church is known for its huge and exquisite collection of images depicting the Passion of Christ, its century-old paintings and wooden images of saints (or poon).

History 
Paete was established as town in 1580 by Franciscan priest, Fray Juan Plasencia under the patronage of Saint Lawrence. Due to the scarcity of religious men, it was annexed to the visita  of Lumban until October 20, 1600 and to Pangil until 1602. The first parish priest of Paete, Fray Pedro de Buenaventura was appointed in 1602. The first stone church and convent were built by Paete natives under the supervision of Fray Andres de Puertellanoin 1646 but it was later destroyed by an earthquake in 1717. A new stone church was started the same year under Fray Francisco de la Fuente. It was completed in 1840 under the term of Fray Luis de Nambroca. The church and convent was again destroyed by the 1880 Luzon earthquake. In 1884, the church was rebuilt under Father Pedro Galiano, now facing the Laguna lake but this was again destroyed by another earthquake on August 20, 1937. The church served as a dungeon and torture house to the people of Paete during the Japanese occupation of the Philippines in World War II.

Features 
The church underwent a lot of renovation due to natural calamities. With a long history of losing the church building to earthquakes, the current baroque mission church has large buttresses on each side to improve its earthquake resistance. It was made of adobe bricks, a mixture of egg white and other native materials. The church has an elaborate baroque style with a fusion of oriental artistry. The intricate retablo pieces were made by Paetenian natives, among them were Bartolome Palatino and Francisco Macahumpan.

Façade 
The church's facade is divided by a frieze that continues around the adjoining belltower. It has bas reliefs of leaves and flowers and a sculpted image of St. James depicted as a Santiago Matamoros (Saint James the Moor-slayer) in a central niche of the upper story. The relief of Saint James is no longer the original image. The present relief which replaced the original one was installed in 1804. The triangular stepped pediment has a circular aperture directly above the image of St. James. Several arched windows decorate the belltower.

Luciano Dans Murals 
The large wall paintings on wood panels inside the church were executed by another notable son of Paete, Luciano Dans. These depict  Langit, Lupa, Impiyerno - Heaven, Earth, Hell - and large murals of Saint Christopher. Dans used natural color pigments mixed with volcanic ash and brushes made from cats' hair to create the murals. The large painting of San Cristobal on wood was purchased during the time of Father Francisco de Santa Gonzaleza for ₱22 in October 1852. Unfortunately, the two St. Christopher paintings currently need immediate conservation.: a lot of wood panels inside the church, including the painted wood panels, are infested by termites.

Another mural created by another unknown artist and the oldest among all murals inside the church is the Last Judgment or Juicio Final painted around 1720. It is located near the church altar.

Church Traditions

Lenten and Holy Week Traditions 
At the start of the Lenten season, owners of privately owned religious images that were handed down from generations put up an exhibit of their religious icons on the church's hall. The collection of images is one of the largest collection of images depicting the passion of Christ. The exhibit usually ran from Ash Wednesday up to Holy Monday. On Holy Tuesday, a procession of miniature poon carried by children along the church patio. From Holy Wednesday up to Good Friday, locals processed their religious images around the town.

The most famous poon during the holy week celebration is Mariano Cagahastian Madriñan's replica of his own work of Mater Dolorosa. Madriñan, Paete's hero received a diploma of award and the King Alfonso XII of Spain Medal of Honor for his Mater Dolorosa work in 1882 which was exhibited at the International Exposition held in Amsterdam. The image of the Mother of Sorrows was known for its movable parts with excellent articulation. During procession, the image could be made to embrace the statue of Christ carrying His cross, look up to gaze at St. Veronica's veil and bless her with the sign of the cross. The image of St. Veronica could also move its hand to show the veil imprinted with Christ's face.

Salibanda 
The celebration of Salibanda is celebrated every third week of January. It marks the end of the Christmas season in Paete and the feast of the Infant Jesus (or Santo Niño). It starts with a fluvial parade along with an image of Santo Niño and followed by a dance procession to the church.

Feast of San Antonio Abad 
The feast of San Antonio Abad, Paete's secondary patron is celebrated every January 17. A small stone chapel or ermita dedicated to the Saint Anthony is located near the main church.

Notes

Bibliography

External links 

 The Roman Catholic Parish of Saint James the Apostle, Paete, Laguna (Official Facebook page)

Paete
Paete
Paete
Paete
Paete
Paete
Paete
Churches in the Roman Catholic Diocese of San Pablo